Sebastián Chiola (5 May 1902 – 7 February 1950) was an Argentine film actor. In 1945 he won the Silver Condor Award for Best Supporting Actor for his performance in the thriller The Corpse Breaks a Date (1944).

Selected filmography
 Palermo (1937)
 La fuga (1937)
 The Outlaw (1939)
 Con el dedo en el gatillo (1940)
 Historia de una noche (1941)
 Vidas marcadas (1942)
 The Gaucho War (1942)
 A Doll's House (1943)
 Gold in the Hand (1943)
 Viaje sin regreso (1946)
 Hardly a Criminal (1949)

References

Bibliography 
 Finkielman, Jorge. The Film Industry in Argentina: An Illustrated Cultural History. McFarland, 2003.

External links 
 

1902 births
1950 deaths
Argentine male film actors
Male actors from Rosario, Santa Fe
20th-century Argentine male actors